Majid Rabah (born July 25, 1980, in Aix-en-Provence) is a French professional footballer. He currently plays in the Championnat de France amateur for US Marignane.

Rabah played on the professional level in Ligue 2 for Sporting Toulon Var.

External links
 Career summary by playerhistory.com

1980 births
Living people
French footballers
Ligue 2 players
SC Toulon players
Marignane Gignac Côte Bleue FC players
Association football midfielders